Deoria district, one of the districts of eastern Uttar Pradesh, India has its headquarters located at Deoria and is a part of Gorakhpur division. It came into existence on 16 March 1946 from Gorakhpur district.

History

Ancient
The area now known as the Deoria District was once a part of the Kosala Kingdom - a prime centre of ancient Aryan culture surrounded by the Himalayas in the north, the Shyandika river in the south, the Panchala Kingdom in the west and the Magadh Kingdom in Bihar to the east. Apart from the many legends told about this area, archaeological remains, such as statues, coins, bricks, Temples. Most of the People using surname Rao belong to the Kshatriya caste in Deoria Dist,.

The ancient history of the district is related with the Ramayana times when the Lord of Kosala, Ram, appointed his elder son Kusha the king of Kushwati, which is present-day Kushinagar. Before the Mahabharata era, this area had been related with Chakravorty Samrat Mahasudtsan Malla and his kingdom. Kushinagar was well developed and prosperous. Close to the border of his kingdom was the thick forested area called the Mahavan. This area was under the control of the Maurya rulers, the Gupta rulers, the Bihar rulers, and then the Garhwal ruler Govinda Chandra from 1114 AD until 1154 AD.

Modern
The Deoria district came into existence on 16 March 1946, being separated from the Gorakhpur District. It is believed that the name Deoria is derived from Devaranya or possibly Devpuria. According to official gazetteers, the district was named "Deoria" after its headquarters in Deoria, and the term Deoria generally means a place where there are temples. The name Deoria probably developed because of the existence of important temples in the area. The famous temples & places in Deoria to see are Devraha baba ashram and Dugdheswarnath Mandir. During British rule the district was under the control of Majhauli Royal family and prominent landlords of Kayastha community, with their descendants still owning major chunks of land (Munshi Gorakhnath). Some other families had their impact on various part of the district in which Dubey's of Badkagaon are quite famous. During Freedom struggle of India the district joined struggle under the leadership of Pandit Bibhuti Mani Tripathi of village Dehrauli, Rudrapur.

Geography
Deoria district is located between 26 ° 6' and 26° 48' north latitude to 83° 23'  and  84° 16' east longitude.  It is surrounded by Kushinagar district in the north,  Gopalganj and Siwan districts of Bihar  in the east, Mau and Ballia districts in the south and  Gorakhpur district in the west. The district has two Nagar Palika Parishad- Deoria and Gaura Barhaj . It has nine Nagar Panchayats which are Baitalpur, Hetimpur, Rudrapur, Rampur Karkhana, Bariyarpur, Bhatni Bazar, Bhatpar Rani, Gauri Bazar, Lar, Majhauli Raj and Salempur. Hetimpur is a newly created nagar panchayat located at the banks of Chhoti Gandak river near the NH 27.

Ghaghara,  Rapti and Chhoti Gandak are the main rivers in the district.

Demographics

Religion

According to the 2011 census Deoria district has a population of 3,100,946. This gives it a ranking of 114th in India (out of a total of 640). Its population growth rate over the decade 2001-2011 was 14.23%. Deoria has a sex ratio of 1013 females for every 1000 males, and a literacy rate of 73.53%. Scheduled Castes and Scheduled Tribes made up 15.11% and 3.54% of the population respectively.

Languages

At the time of the 2011 Census of India, 85.80% of the population in the district spoke Bhojpuri, 12.67% Hindi and 1.40% Urdu as their first language.

Bhojpuri is the native language of Deoria. The Bhojpuri variant of Kaithi is the indigenous script of Bhojpuri language.

Notable people
 Lal Khadag Bahadur Malla, Bhojpuri Author. 
 Moti BA, Bhojpuri Poet, lyricist and Musician.
 Nripendra Misra - Former Principal Secretary to the Prime Minister of India
 Prakash Mani Tripathi - former member of Lok Sabha from Deoria parliamentary constituency.'''
 Surya Pratap Shahi - Member of 9th, 11th, 13th and 17th Legislative Assembly of Uttar Pradesh. Currently, he is serving as Cabinet Minister in Uttar Pradesh Government with the portfolio of Agriculture, Agriculture Education, and Agriculture Research.

Colleges

 Government Inter College

References

External links

 
Districts of Uttar Pradesh